The first season of Canta Comigo premiered on Wednesday, July 18, 2018 at 10:30 p.m. (BRT / AMT) on RecordTV.

On September 12, 2018, Débora Pinheiro won the competition with 48.80% of the public vote over Gabriel Camilo (35.07%) and Naheda Beydoun (16.13%).

Heats
 Key
  – Artist advanced to the live finals with an all-100 stand up
  – Artist advanced to the semifinals with the highest score
  – Artist advanced to the sing-off in either 2nd or 3rd place
  – Artist score enough points to place in the Top 3 but was moved out and eliminated
  – Artist didn't score enough points to place in the Top 3 and was directly eliminated
  – Artist was eliminated but received the judges' save and advanced to the semifinals

Heat 1

Sing-off details

Heat 2

Sing-off details

Heat 3

Sing-off details

Heat 4

Sing-off details

Heat 5

Sing-off details

Heat 6

Sing-off details

Semifinals

Week 1

Sing-off details

Week 2

Sing-off details

Finals
 Group performance: "Beautiful Day"

Sing-off details

Elimination chart
Key

Ratings and reception

Brazilian ratings
All numbers are in points and provided by Kantar Ibope Media.

References

External links
 Canta Comigo on R7.com

2018 Brazilian television seasons
All Together Now (franchise)